Home in Toa Payoh is a Singapore Chinese drama which had its original run telecast in December 2003. The drama is produced by Singapore's MediaCorp TV Channel 8. It was re-aired in 2007 on every weekday, 5.30pm on Channel 8.

Synopsis
The first four minutes of the first episode introduces Toa Payoh, one of Singapore's oldest estates, and chronicles its development from a small "kampung" along swampy marshland to a modernised thriving neighbourhood. The series depicts life in a typical HDB estate.

Baomei, Pengkun and Guocheng are childhood friends who grew up together in Toa Payoh. Baomei is an overly thrifty bachelor who is a foreman at a factory. Pengkun is a top technician at Baomei's factory but is always skiving to return home early to be with his wife and children. Guocheng is a highly successful insurance salesman with a loving but constantly nagging wife Huiming. The three of them and their families have to put up with the gossipy and quarrelsome Auntie Fen who often argues with Guocheng's father-in-law.

Cast

Main cast
Li Nanxing as Li Baomei "Ah Bee" 李保美
Cavin Soh as Zhou Pengkun 周朋琨
Huang Yiliang as Yuan Guocheng 袁国程
Huang Biren as Zheng Huiming 郑惠明 "Kaypoh Queen"
Fiona Xie as Yuan Shuhuai 袁淑怀
Mimi Chu as Wu Lifen "Elephant" 吴立纷

Supporting Cast
Li Wenhai as Zheng Daba 郑大跋
Yang Libing as Wu Jinxiu 吴锦绣, Lifen's niece
Zen Chong as Dino
Liang Tian as "Ninth Uncle" (九叔)
Rayson Tan
Yan Bingliang as factory boss
Margaret Lee as Qunying

External links
Home in Toa Payoh (English)
Home in Toa Payoh (Chinese)
Home in Toa Payoh (mewatch)

2000s Singaporean television series
2003 Singaporean television series debuts
2004 Singaporean television series endings
Singapore Chinese dramas
Channel 8 (Singapore) original programming